Zoltán Gera (August 19, 1923 – November 7, 2014) was a Hungarian actor, honored with being chosen as an Actor of the Hungarian Nation, the Kossuth Prize, and the Meritorious Artist Award of Hungary. He has starred in 115 movies (according to IMDb).

Early life 
Zoltán Gera was born on 19 August 1923 in Szeged, Hungary. Gera started working with several theaters while he was a teenager. Gera graduated from the College of Theater and Film Arts(now the University of Theatre and Film Arts).

Death 
Gera died on 7 November 2014 at Budapest, Hungary.

Awards
 1985 Magyarország Érdemes Művésze díj
 2004 Distinguished Artist Award
 2012 Grand Commander to the Hungarian Order of Merit
 2013 Kossuth Prize
 2014 Actor of the Hungarian Nation

International filmography

 És a vakok látnak... (1944)
 A város alatt (1956)
 Szakadék (1956)
 Az eltüsszentett birodalom (1956) - Udvaronc
 Bakaruhában (1957) - Postás
 Láz (1957)
 Csigalépcső (1957)
 Dani (1957)
 Éjfélkor (1957) - (uncredited)
 Csendes otthon (1958)
 Iron Flower (1958) - Novák
 La Belle et le Tzigane (1958) - Zenész
 Micsoda éjszaka! (1958) - Nyomozó (uncredited)
 Csempészek (1958) - Tekejátékos
 Édes Anna (1958) - Újságíró (uncredited)
 Kölyök (1959)
 Felfelé a lejtőn (1959)
 A harminckilences dandár (1959)
 Álmatlan évek (1959)
 A harangok Rómába mentek (1959) - Karszalagos
 Kard és kocka (1959)
 Szerelem csütörtök (1959)
 A megfelelő ember (1960)
 Virrad (1960)
 Fűre lépni szabad (1960)
 Az arc nélküli város (1960) - Lajos
 Alba Regia (1961)
 Négyen az árban (1961)
 Puskák és galambok (1961)
 Two Half Times in Hell (1961) - Tankó Sándor
 Áprilisi riadó (1962)
 Mindenki ártatlan? (1962)
 Mici néni két élete (1963)
 Meztelen diplomata (1963) - (uncredited)
 Mindennap élünk (1963)
 Egy ember, aki nincs (1964) - Újságíró
 The Golden Head (1964)
 My Way Home (1965) - Hadifogoly
 Ketten haltak meg (1966) - Raktáros
 Sok hűség semmiért (1966)
 Holdudvar (1969) - Balassa barátja
 Alfa Romeó és Júlia (1969) - (uncredited)
 Krebsz, az isten (1970) - Dr. Mikulik
 Utazás a koponyám körül (1970) - Sorbanálló (uncredited)
 A nagy kék jelzés (1970) - Jenő főnöke
 A halhatatlan légiós (1971) - Rabbi
 A vőlegény nyolckor érkezik (1972) - Az Étterem Vezetője
  (1973) - Kárász úr
 Csínom Palkó (1973) - Leopold, szakács
 A locsolókocsi (1974) - Tanár
 Illatos út a semmibe (1974)
 Kincskereső kisködmön (1974) - Körtemuzsika árus
 Ballagó idő (1976) - Tanító
 Psevdonim: Lukac (1977)
 Hungarians (1978) - Brainer, intézõ
 Örökség (1980) - Hungarian dubbing voice: Uncle Fülöp
 Naplemente délben (1980) - Az impresszárió
 Circus maximus (1980) - Bajuszos tiszt
 Nárcisz és Psyché (1980) - Orfeum director
 Der Mann, der sich in Luft auflöste (1980) - Kuti, the porter
 A remény joga (1981) - Az orvos
 Escape to Victory (1981) - Victor - The French
 Nyom nélkül (1982) - A nyomozás vezetõje
 Hatásvadászok (1983) - Selmeczi
 Vérszerződés (1983) - Apa
 Wagner (1983, TV Mini-Series) - Lüttichau
 A csoda vége (1984) - Bakos Sanyi
 Szeretők (1984) - Dékán
 Boszorkányszombat (1984) - Király
 Házasság szabadnappal (1984)
 Lily in Love (1984) - Malev Officer
 The Treasure of Swamp Castle (1985) - Asil (voice)
 Khromoy dervish (1986)
 Cat City (1986) - Captain (voice, uncredited)
 Akli Miklós (1986)
 Mamiblu (1986)
 Szamárköhögés (1987) - Szomszéd
 Doktor Minorka Vidor nagy napja (1987) - Tyúkárus
 Küldetés Evianba (1988) 
 Laurin (1989) - Herr Engels 
 Music Box (1989) - Man in Budapest 
 The Bachelor (1990)
 The Long Shadow (1992) - Rabbi Rosner
 Maigret (1992, in the episode "Maigret and the Burglar's Wife") - Waiter
 Prinzenbad (1993)
 A gólyák mindig visszatérnek (1993) - Tiszteletes
 Mesmer (1994) - Another Doctor
 Bűvös vadász (1994) - Shoemaker
 Le jardin des plantes (1994) - Marcel
 Citizen X (1995, TV Movie) - Doctor
 Ébredés (1995) - Józsi bácsi
 The Hunchback (1997, TV Movie) - Overweight Noble
 For My Baby (1997) - Jackie Weiss
 Retúr (1997) - Nagypapa
 The Gambler (1997) - Creditor
 Shot through the heart (1998, TV Movie) - Nebojis
 Crime and Punishment (1998, TV Movie) - Praskovya
 The Fall (1999) - Concierge
 Sunshine (1999) - Man at Synagogue
 The Prince and the Pauper (2000, TV Movie) - Merchant
 Contaminated Man (2000) - Store Owner
 Uprising (2001, TV Movie) - Market Vendor
 Az utolsó blues (2002) - Sanu
 Rose's Songs (2003) - Mr. Waltz
 Egy hét Pesten és Budán (2003) - Szállodaportás
 Prima Primavera (2009) - Dr. Ferenczy (final film role)

References

External links
 

1923 births
Hungarian male film actors
Hungarian male stage actors
2014 deaths
Artists of Merit of the Hungarian People's Republic